This is a list of investigational sexual dysfunction drugs, or drugs that are currently under development for clinical treatment of sexual dysfunction but are not yet approved. Chemical/generic names are listed first, with developmental code names, synonyms, and brand names in parentheses.

Atrophic vaginitis
 Estetrol (E4; Donesta) – estrogen receptor agonist Estetrol - Mithra Pharmaceuticals - AdisInsight
 Lasofoxifene (CP-336156, CP-336156-CB, Fablyn, Oporia) – selective estrogen receptor modulatorLasofoxifene - Sermonix Pharmaceuticals - AdisInsight

Erectile dysfunction
 HCP-1302 – undefined mechanism of actionHCP 1302 - AdisInsight
 Nitroglycerin gel (Eroxon, Futura, MED-2001–MED-2005) – nitric oxide donorNitroglycerin gel - Futura Medical - AdisInsight
 Tadalafil/tamsulosin (HCP-1303, CKD-397, YBH-1603)Tadalafil/tamsulosin - Hanmi Pharmaceutical - AdisInsightTadalafil/tamsulosin - Ildong Pharmaceutical - AdisInsightTadalafil/tamsulosin - Chong Kun Dang - AdisInsightTadalafil/tamsulosin - Yungjin Pharmaceutical - AdisInsight
 TT-701 (LY-2452473) – selective androgen receptor modulatorOPK 88004 - AdisInsight

Female anorgasmia
 Testosterone low-dose intranasal (MPP-14, TBS-2, Noseafix, Tefina) – androgen receptor agonist Testosterone intranasal (low-dose) - Acerus Pharmaceuticals - AdisInsight

Female sexual dysfunction
 BP-101 – undefined mechanism of action BP 101 - Ovoca Bio - AdisInsight
 Bupropion/trazodone (S1P-104, S1P-205, Lorexys, Orexa) – norepinephrine reuptake inhibitor, nicotinic acetylcholine receptor antagonist, 5-HT2A receptor antagonist, α1-adrenergic receptor antagonist, weak serotonin reuptake inhibitorBupropion/trazodone - AdisInsight
 Buspirone/testosterone (Lybridos) – 5-HT1A receptor partial agonist and androgen receptor agonist Buspirone/testosterone - Emotional Brain - AdisInsight
 Lasofoxifene (CP-336156, CP-336156-CB, Fablyn, Oporia) – selective estrogen receptor modulator Lasofoxifene - Sermonix Pharmaceuticals - AdisInsight
 PL-6983 – selective MC4 receptor agonist Research programme: sexual dysfunction therapy - Palatin Technologies - AdisInsight
 Sildenafil/testosterone (Lybrido) – PDE5 inhibitor and androgen receptor agonist Sildenafil/testosterone - Emotional Brain - AdisInsight
 TGFK09SD – 5-HT1A receptor agonist TGFK 09SD - AdisInsight

Premature ejaculation
 Clomipramine/sildenafil (CDFR-0812) – serotonin reuptake inhibitor and PDE5 inhibitor Clomipramine/sildenafil - CTC Bio - AdisInsight
 DA-8031 – serotonin reuptake inhibitor DA 8031 - AdisInsight
 IX-01 – oxytocin receptor antagonist Cligosiban - Ixchelsis - AdisInsight
 OnabotulinumtoxinA (botulinum toxin A, Botox) – acetylcholine release inhibitorOnabotulinum toxin A - AbbVie - AdisInsight

Unspecified
 Vilazodone (Viibryd, EMD-68843, SB-659746A) – 5-HT1A receptor partial agonist and serotonin reuptake inhibitor Vilazodone - AbbVie - AdisInsight

See also
 List of investigational drugs

References

External links
 AdisInsight - Springer

Sexual dysfunction drugs, investigational
Experimental drugs
Sexual dysfunction drugs